José Demetrio Jiménez Sánchez-Mariscal (8 October 1963 – 23 October 2019) was an Argentine Roman Catholic bishop.

Jiménez-Mariscal was born in Spain and was ordained to the priesthood in 1988. He served as bishop of the Roman Catholic Territorial Prelature of Cafayate, Argentina from 2014 until his death in 2019.

Notes

1963 births
2019 deaths
21st-century Roman Catholic bishops in Argentina
Spanish Roman Catholic bishops in South America
Roman Catholic bishops of Cafayate